Classic Nuts, Vol. 1 is the last of three greatest hits albums by hip hop group The Beatnuts. It was released by Loud Records during its merger with Relativity on February 19, 2002. Released prior to The Originators, another 2002 Beatnuts album, it only contains songs from The Beatnuts' first four full-length albums and Intoxicated Demons: The EP. It additionally features two exclusive songs, "We Got the Funk" and "However Whenever (You Want It)". The album failed to chart, but received a positive review from Allmusic.

Track listing

References 

The Beatnuts albums
2002 greatest hits albums